This page tracks the progress of the Lithuanian national basketball team participating in the 2014 FIBA Basketball World Cup.

Main roster 
On May 13, head coach Jonas Kazlauskas announced both the extended 24–player main roster and the reserve roster for the national team. On July 1, he announced the condensed candidate roster consisting of 17 players. On August 11, he narrowed the list down to 14 players.

Candidates that did not make it to the final team 

* – Juškevičius was recalled to the national team after Kalnietis' injury vs. Croatia.

Depth chart

Preparation matches

Preliminary round

Knockout stage

Quarterfinals

Semifinals

Third place playoff

Reserve roster 
The main goal of the reserve roster is to prepare the team for participation in the 2015 Summer Universiade held in South Korea. Some candidates are listed in both the main roster and the reserve roster.

|}
| valign="top" |
Head coach
 
Assistant coach(es)

Legend
 Club – describes lastclub before the tournament
 Age – describes age August 30, 2014
|}

Candidates that did not make it to the final team

Friendly matches

Promoted to the Main roster

References 

 
2014
World